Rynn Lim Yu Zhong is a Malaysian singer and actor. He acted various roles in dramas from Malaysia, Singapore, China and Taiwan. He also once in a first collaboration drama of Malaysia Media Prima Berhad and Singapore MediaCorp Studios Pte Ltd.

Album
 2005 – 个人首张专辑 Ge Ren Shou Zhang Zhuan Ji (1st)
 2007 – 淋雨中 Lin Yu Zhong (In The Rain)
 2008 – 干物世界 Gan Wu Shi Jie (Homely Life)
 2009 – All About Rynn 新歌 + 自选集 
 2010 – 新娘 Xin Niang (Dearest Bride)
 2014 – 捨得 She De (Give & Take)

Awards
 2006 – Best Newcomer at the 17th Golden Melody Awards (Taiwan)
 2006 – Most Popular New Artiste in the 6th Global Chinese Song Festival Awards
 2006 – Most Popular K-song Award (Bronze) for 《靠岸》 (Kao An) in the Malaysia 2006 Entertainment Awards
 2006 – Top 10 International Original Composition for 《靠岸》 (Kao An) in the Malaysia 2006 Entertainment Awards
 2006 – Top 10 Local Original Composition for 《失恋学》 (Shi Lian Xue) in the Malaysia 2006 Entertainment Awards
 2006 – Golden Award for Best New Artiste in the Malaysia 2006 Entertainment Awards

Acting career

External links
 RYNN LIM FORUM 
 Rynn Lim Sina Weibo 微博
 Rynn Lim Official Facebook page
 Official Ocean Butterflies site
 Rynn Lim Album Lyrics
 All about Rynn Lim
 林宇中家族

1978 births
Living people
Malaysian people of Hokkien descent
Malaysian people of Chinese descent
Malaysian Mandopop singers
People from Kuching
21st-century Malaysian male singers
Malaysian male television actors
University of Malaya alumni